Sainte-Radegonde (Languedocien: Senta Radegonda) is a commune in the Aveyron department in Occitania in southern France.

Population

See also
Communes of the Aveyron department

References

Communes of Aveyron
Aveyron communes articles needing translation from French Wikipedia